Benedict Glacier is a glacier on central Ellesmere Island, Nunavut, Canada.

Glaciers of Qikiqtaaluk Region
Ellesmere Island
Arctic Cordillera